Carlos Javier Abad-Hernández Trujillo (born 28 June 1995) is a Spanish professional footballer who plays as a goalkeeper for Atlético Baleares.

Club career
Born in Puerto de la Cruz, Santa Cruz de Tenerife, Canary Islands, Abad graduated from CD Tenerife's youth setup. He made his debuts as a senior with the reserves in the 2013–14 campaign in Tercera División, while still a junior.

Initially a fourth-choice goalkeeper at the start of 2014–15, Abad profited from Jacobo Sanz's departure and Nauzet Santana's serious injury, being promoted to Roberto's backup. On 16 November 2014 he played his first match as a professional, replacing the latter due to injury in a 0–2 away loss against UE Llagostera in the Segunda División championship.

On 24 July 2015 Abad extended his contract with the Blanquiazules until 2020, and was loaned to Real Madrid Castilla five days later, for two years. He returned to the Blanquiazules for the 2017–18 campaign, but acted as a backup to Dani Hernández. On 23 August 2018, he was loaned to fellow second division side Córdoba CF, and became a first-choice mainly due to the club's poor financial situation.

On 3 July 2019, Abad extended his contract until 2022 and was immediately loaned to Super League Greece side Xanthi FC for one year.
He finished the season by being the goalkeeper who made more saves in the league, making 70 saves (four more than Asteras Tripoli's Nikos Papadopoulos), conceding only 27 goals and picking up six clean sheets.

On 3 September 2020, Abad joined recently relegated side Deportivo de La Coruña on a two-year deal.

Career statistics

Club

References

External links

1995 births
Living people
Spanish footballers
Footballers from Puerto de la Cruz
Association football goalkeepers
Segunda División players
Segunda División B players
Tercera División players
CD Tenerife B players
CD Tenerife players
Real Madrid Castilla footballers
Córdoba CF players
Deportivo de La Coruña players
Super League Greece players
Xanthi F.C. players
Spanish expatriate footballers
Spanish expatriate sportspeople in Greece
Expatriate footballers in Greece